Dioryctria martini is a species of snout moth in the genus Dioryctria. It was described by Akira Mutuura and Herbert H. Neunzig in 1986. It is found in the Mexican state of Durango and city of Toluca.

The length of the forewing is 14.5–17 mm. The forewing ground colour is fuscous, while the hindwings are smoky grey, but darker at the outer margin.

The larvae feed on Pinus oocarpa.

References

Moths described in 1959
martini